Boualapha is a district (muang) of Khammouane province in central Laos. Hin Namno National Park is in this district.

References

Districts of Khammouane province